Coupe de l'Archipel is the annual men's domestic association football cup competition of Saint Pierre and Miquelon. A tournament for futsal is also held annually.

History
The tournament was first played in 1976.

Format
The format of the cup was adjusted to its current format in 1983. The tournament consists of one match with the first place team in the Ligue SPM facing the second place team in mid September each year.

Clubs

Winners
1976 : AS Ilienne Amateur         
1977 : AS Ilienne Amateur         
1978 : AS Ilienne Amateur         
1979 : AS Ilienne Amateur         
1980 : AS Ilienne Amateur         
1981 : AS Ilienne Amateur         
1982 : AS Ilienne Amateur         
1983 : AS Ilienne Amateur         
1984 :  not played
1985 : AS Ilienne Amateur         
1986 : AS Ilienne Amateur         
1987 : AS Ilienne Amateur         
1988 : AS Ilienne Amateur   
1989 :   not played
1990 : AS Saint-Pierraise  
1991 : AS Ilienne Amateur         
1992 : AS Ilienne Amateur         
1993 : AS Miquelonnaise
1994 :   not played
1995 : AS Ilienne Amateur         
1996 : AS Ilienne Amateur     
1997 : AS Miquelonnaise
1998 :   not played
1999 : AS Saint-Pierraise  
2000 : AS Miquelonnaise   
2001 : AS Saint-Pierraise     
2002 : AS Ilienne Amateur         
2003 : AS Ilienne Amateur       
2004 : AS Miquelonnaise  
2005 : AS Miquelonnaise            
2006 : AS Ilienne Amateur
2007 : AS Saint-Pierraise  
2008 : AS Miquelonnaise
2009 : AS Miquelonnaise
2010 : AS Ilienne Amateur         
2011 : AS Ilienne Amateur         
2012 : AS Ilienne Amateur
2013 : AS Miquelonnaise            
2014 : AS Ilienne Amateur                       
2015 : AS Saint-Pierraise         
2016 : AS Saint-Pierraise          
2017 : AS Ilienne Amateur           
2018 : AS Ilienne Amateur          
2019 : AS Saint-Pierraise
2020 : AS Saint-Pierraise

References

Recurring sporting events established in 1976
National association football cups
1976 establishments in North America

External links
RSSSF List of Champions